The CHL Goaltender of the Year Award is given out annually to the top goaltender in the Canadian Hockey League. It is chosen from the winners of the league awards; the OHL Goaltender of the Year, the Del Wilson Trophy (WHL), and the Jacques Plante Memorial Trophy (QMJHL).

Winners
List of winners of the CHL Goaltender of the Year Award.

See also
 List of Canadian Hockey League awards

References

External links
 CHL Awards – CHL

Canadian Hockey League trophies and awards
Ice hockey goaltender awards
Awards established in 1988